István Tóth is a Hungarian sprint canoer who competed in the early to mid-1980s. He won three medals in the K-2 10000 m event at the ICF Canoe Sprint World Championships with two silvers (1983, 1985) and a bronze (1982).

References

Hungarian male canoeists
Living people
Year of birth missing (living people)
ICF Canoe Sprint World Championships medalists in kayak
20th-century Hungarian people